Carl Gustav Witt (29 October 1866 – 3 January 1946) was a German astronomer and discoverer of two asteroids who worked at the Berlin Urania Observatory, a popular observatory of the Urania astronomical association of Berlin.

He wrote a doctoral thesis under the direction of Julius Bauschinger.

Witt discovered two asteroids, most notably 433 Eros, the first asteroid with a male name, and the first known near-Earth object. His first minor planet discovery was the main-belt asteroid 422 Berolina, that bears the Latin name of his adoptive city.

The minor planet 2732 Witt – an A-type asteroid from the main-belt, discovered by Max Wolf at Heidelberg Observatory in 1926 – was named in his memory by American astronomer and MPC's longtime director, Brian G. Marsden. Naming citation was published on 22 September 1983.

References 
 

1866 births
1946 deaths
Discoverers of asteroids
20th-century German astronomers
19th-century German astronomers